The 2013–14 Philadelphia Flyers season was the 47th season for the National Hockey League franchise that was established on June 5, 1967.

Off-season
The Flyers first major move of the off-season was trading for the negotiating rights to New York Islanders defenseman Mark Streit, an impending unrestricted free agent, for a fourth-round pick in the 2014 NHL Entry Draft and minor league forward Shane Harper. Streit signed a four-year, $21 million contract with the Flyers.

Following the 2012–13 NHL lockout each team was granted two compliance buyouts to be exercised after the 2012–13 season and/or after the 2013–14 season that would not count against the salary cap in any further year, regardless of the player's age. The Flyers used their two compliance buyouts on June 27, 2013, buying out centerman Danny Briere and goaltender Ilya Bryzgalov. Briere had two years and $5 million left on the eight-year, $52 million contract he signed with the Flyers on July 1, 2007. Bryzgalov had seven years and $34.5 million left on the nine-year, $51 million contract he signed with the Flyers on June 23, 2011.

The Flyers made two major signings in free agency. Former Tampa Bay Lightning centerman Vincent Lecavalier, who had been bought out by the team he spent his first 14 NHL seasons with, signed a five-year, $22.5 million contract on July 2, 2013. Former Flyers goaltender Ray Emery, who had spent the previous season with the Chicago Blackhawks, returned to Flyers by signing a one-year, $1.65 million contract on July 5. On the same day, the Flyers signed star center Claude Giroux to an eight-year contract extension worth $66.2 million.

Regular season
After a second consecutive 0–3 start to the regular season, Head Coach Peter Laviolette and Assistant Coach Kevin McCarthy were fired on October 7. Assistant Coach Craig Berube, who previously played for the Flyers and served two stints as head coach of the Flyers' AHL affiliate, the Philadelphia Phantoms, was named the new head coach while John Paddock and Ian Laperriere were announced as Berube's assistant coaches. Assistant Coach Joe Mullen and Goaltending Coach Jeff Reese were also retained.

Standings

Playoffs

The Philadelphia Flyers entered the playoffs as the Metropolitan Division's third seed. They faced the New York Rangers in the first round and lost the series 4 games to 3.

Schedule and results

Preseason

|-  style="text-align:center; background:#fcc;"
| 1 || September 15 || Toronto || 4–3 || Philadelphia || || Stolarz || 9,100 || 0–1–0 || 
|-  style="text-align:center; background:#ffc;"
| 2 || September 16 || Washington || 4–3 || Philadelphia || SO || Emery || 19,142 || 0–1–1 || 
|-  style="text-align:center; background:#cfc;"
| 3 || September 16 || Philadelphia || 3–2 || Toronto || SO || Heeter || 19,185 || 1–1–1 || 
|-  style="text-align:center; background:#fcc;"
| 4 || September 17 || NY Rangers || 3–2 || Philadelphia || || Mason || 19,142 || 1–2–1 || 
|-  style="text-align:center; background:#fcc;"
| 5 || September 24 || New Jersey || 2–1 || Philadelphia || || Emery || 19,360 || 1–3–1 || 
|-  style="text-align:center; background:#fcc;"
| 6 || September 26 || Philadelphia || 1–4 || New Jersey || || Mason || 11,789 || 1–4–1 || 
|-  style="text-align:center; background:#fcc;"
| 7 || September 27 || Philadelphia || 3–6 || Washington || || Emery || 17,121 || 1–5–1 || 
|-
| colspan="10" style="text-align:center;"|
Notes:
 Game played at Budweiser Gardens in London, Ontario.
|-

|-
| Legend:

Regular season

|-  style="text-align:center; background:#fcc;"
| 1 || October 2 || Toronto || 3–1 || Philadelphia || || Mason || 19,872 || 0–1–0 || 0 || 
|-  style="text-align:center; background:#fcc;"
| 2 || October 5 || Philadelphia || 1–4 || Montreal || || Emery || 21,273 || 0–2–0 || 0 || 
|-  style="text-align:center; background:#fcc;"
| 3 || October 6 || Philadelphia || 1–2 || Carolina || || Mason || 16,088 || 0–3–0 || 0 || 
|-  style="text-align:center; background: #cfc;"
| 4 || October 8 || Florida || 1–2 || Philadelphia || || Mason || 19,589 || 1–3–0 || 2 || 
|-  style="text-align:center; background:#fcc;"
| 5 || October 11 || Phoenix || 2–1 || Philadelphia || || Mason || 19,713 || 1–4–0 || 2 || 
|-  style="text-align:center; background:#fcc;"
| 6 || October 12 || Philadelphia || 2–5 || Detroit || || Emery || 20,066 || 1–5–0 || 2 || 
|-  style="text-align:center; background:#fcc;"
| 7 || October 15 || Vancouver || 3–2 || Philadelphia || || Mason || 19,588 || 1–6–0 || 2 || 
|-  style="text-align:center; background:#fcc;"
| 8 || October 17 || Pittsburgh || 4–1 || Philadelphia || || Mason || 19,735 || 1–7–0 || 2 || 
|-  style="text-align:center; background: #cfc;"
| 9 || October 24 || NY Rangers || 1–2 || Philadelphia || || Mason || 19,768 || 2–7–0 || 4 || 
|-  style="text-align:center; background: #cfc;"
| 10 || October 26 || Philadelphia || 5–2 || NY Islanders || || Mason || 13,620 || 3–7–0 || 6 || 
|-  style="text-align:center; background:#fcc;"
| 11 || October 29 || Anaheim || 3–2 || Philadelphia || || Mason || 19,615 || 3–8–0 || 6 || 
|-

|- style="text-align:center; background:#fcc;"
| 12 || November 1 || Washington || 7–0 || Philadelphia || || Mason || 19,702 || 3–9–0 || 6 || 
|- style="text-align:center; background:#cfc;"
| 13 || November 2 || Philadelphia || 1–0 || New Jersey || || Emery || 13,705 || 4–9–0 || 8 || 
|- style="text-align:center; background:#ffc;"
| 14 || November 5 || Philadelphia || 1–2 || Carolina || OT || Mason || 15,519 || 4–9–1 || 9 || 
|- style="text-align:center; background:#fcc;"
| 15 || November 7 || New Jersey || 3–0 || Philadelphia || || Emery || 19,604 || 4–10–1 || 9 || 
|- style="text-align:center; background:#cfc;"
| 16 || November 9 || Edmonton || 2–4 || Philadelphia || || Mason || 19,725 || 5–10–1 || 11 || 
|- style="text-align:center; background:#cfc;"
| 17 || November 12 || Philadelphia || 5–0 || Ottawa || || Mason || 16,398 || 6–10–1 || 13 || 
|- style="text-align:center; background:#cfc;"
| 18 || November 13 || Philadelphia || 2–1 || Pittsburgh || || Emery || 18,656 || 7–10–1 || 15 || 
|- style="text-align:center; background:#ffc;"
| 19 || November 15 || Philadelphia || 2–3 || Winnipeg || SO || Mason || 15,004 || 7–10–2 || 16 || 
|-  style="text-align:center; background:#cfc;"
| 20 || November 19 || Ottawa || 2–5 || Philadelphia || || Mason || 19,724 || 8–10–2 || 18 || 
|-  style="text-align:center; background:#cfc;"
| 21 || November 21 || Buffalo || 1–4 || Philadelphia || || Emery || 19,973 || 9–10–2 || 20 || 
|-  style="text-align:center; background:#cfc;"
| 22 || November 23 || NY Islanders || 2–5 || Philadelphia || || Mason || 19,829 || 10–10–2 || 22 || 
|-  style="text-align:center; background:#fcc;"
| 23 || November 25 || Philadelphia || 1–3 || Florida || || Mason || 14,299 || 10–11–2 || 22 || 
|-  style="text-align:center; background:#fcc;"
| 24 || November 27 || Philadelphia || 2–4 || Tampa Bay || || Emery || 18,427 || 10–12–2 || 22 || 
|-  style="text-align:center; background:#cfc;"
| 25 || November 29 || Winnipeg || 1–2 || Philadelphia || || Mason || 19,937 || 11–12–2 || 24 || 
|-  style="text-align:center; background:#cfc;"
| 26 || November 30 || Philadelphia || 3–2 || Nashville || SO || Mason || 17,136 || 12–12–2 || 26 || 
|-

|-  style="text-align:center; background:#fcc;"
| 27 || December 2 || Philadelphia || 0–2 || Minnesota || || Emery || 17,676 || 12–13–2 || 26 || 
|-  style="text-align:center; background:#cfc;"
| 28 || December 4 || Philadelphia || 6–3 || Detroit || || Mason || 20,066 || 13–13–2 || 28 || 
|-  style="text-align:center; background:#fcc;"
| 29 || December 7 || Philadelphia || 1–5 || Dallas || || Mason || 8,567 || 13–14–2 || 28 || 
|-  style="text-align:center; background:#ffc;"
| 30 || December 9 || Philadelphia || 4–5 || Ottawa || SO || Mason || 15,786 || 13–14–3 || 29 || 
|-  style="text-align:center; background:#fcc;"
| 31 || December 11 || Philadelphia || 2–7 || Chicago || || Emery || 21,144 || 13–15–3 || 29 || 
|-  style="text-align:center; background:#cfc;"
| 32 || December 12 || Montreal || 1–2 || Philadelphia || || Mason || 19,748 || 14–15–3 || 31 || 
|-  style="text-align:center; background:#ffc;"
| 33 || December 15 || Philadelphia || 4–5 || Washington || SO || Mason || 18,506 || 14–15–4 || 32 || 
|-  style="text-align:center; background:#cfc;"
| 34 || December 17 || Washington || 2–5 || Philadelphia || || Mason || 19,788 || 15–15–4 || 34 || 
|-  style="text-align:center; background:#cfc;"
| 35 || December 19 || Columbus || 4–5 || Philadelphia || || Mason || 19,852 || 16–15–4 || 36 || 
|-  style="text-align:center; background:#fcc;"
| 36 || December 21 || Philadelphia || 3–6 || Columbus || || Emery || 14,090 || 16–16–4 || 36 || 
|-  style="text-align:center; background:#cfc;"
| 37 || December 23 || Minnesota || 1–4 || Philadelphia || || Mason || 19,872 || 17–16–4 || 38 || 
|-  style="text-align:center; background:#cfc;"
| 38 || December 28 || Philadelphia || 4–3 || Edmonton || SO || Mason || 16,839 || 18–16–4 || 40 || 
|-  style="text-align:center; background:#cfc;"
| 39 || December 30 || Philadelphia || 4–3 || Vancouver || SO || Mason || 18,910 || 19–16–4 || 42 || 
|-  style="text-align:center; background:#cfc;"
| 40 || December 31 || Philadelphia || 4–1 || Calgary || || Emery || 19,289 || 20–16–4 || 44 || 
|-

|-  style="text-align:center; background:#fcc;"
| 41 || January 2 || Philadelphia || 1–2 || Colorado || || Mason || 16,793 || 20–17–4 || 44 || 
|-  style="text-align:center; background:#cfc;"
| 42 || January 4 || Philadelphia || 5–3 || Phoenix || || Mason || 14,875 || 21–17–4 || 46 || 
|-  style="text-align:center; background:#cfc;"
| 43 || January 7 || Philadelphia || 3–2 || New Jersey || OT || Emery || 14,521 || 22–17–4 || 48 || 
|-  style="text-align:center; background:#cfc;"
| 44 || January 8 || Montreal || 1–3 || Philadelphia || || Mason || 19,949 || 23–17–4 || 50 || 
|-  style="text-align:center; background:#fcc;"
| 45 || January 11 || Tampa Bay || 6–3 || Philadelphia || || Mason || 19,987 || 23–18–4 || 50 || 
|-  style="text-align:center; background:#fcc;"
| 46 || January 12 || Philadelphia || 1–4 || NY Rangers || || Emery || 18,006 || 23–19–4 || 50 || 
|-  style="text-align:center; background:#cfc;"
| 47 || January 14 || Philadelphia || 4–3 || Buffalo || || Mason || 18,667 || 24–19–4 || 52 || 
|-  style="text-align:center; background:#ffc;"
| 48 || January 16 || Nashville || 4–3 || Philadelphia || SO || Mason || 19,917 || 24–19–5 || 53 || 
|-  style="text-align:center; background:#cfc;"
| 49 || January 18 || NY Islanders || 4–6 || Philadelphia || || Emery || 19,992 || 25–19–5 || 55 || 
|-  style="text-align:center; background:#ffc;"
| 50 || January 20 || Philadelphia || 3–4 || NY Islanders || SO || Emery || 16,048 || 25–19–6 || 56 || 
|- align="center" bgcolor="#ccc"
| – || January 21 || Carolina || || Philadelphia ||colspan="6" | Game rescheduled to January 22 due to a snowstorm in Philadelphia.
|-  style="text-align:center; background:#fcc;"
| 51 || January 22 || Carolina || 3–2 || Philadelphia || || Mason || 19,592 || 25–20–6 || 56 || 
|-  style="text-align:center; background:#fcc;"
| 52 || January 23 || Philadelphia || 2–5 || Columbus || || Emery || 15,571 || 25–21–6 || 56 || 
|-  style="text-align:center; background:#fcc;"
| 53 || January 25 || Boston || 6–1 || Philadelphia || || Mason || 19,938 || 25–22–6 || 56 || 
|-  style="text-align:center; background:#cfc;"
| 54 || January 28 || Detroit || 0–5 || Philadelphia || || Mason || 19,987 || 26–22–6 || 58 || 
|-  style="text-align:center; background:#fcc;"
| 55 || January 30 || Philadelphia || 3–5 || Anaheim || || Mason || 16,007 || 26–23–6 || 58 || 
|-

|-  style="text-align:center; background:#cfc;"
| 56 || February 1 || Philadelphia || 2–0 || Los Angeles || || Mason || 18,118 || 27–23–6 || 60 || 
|-  style="text-align:center; background:#cfc;"
| 57 || February 3 || Philadelphia || 5–2 || San Jose || || Mason || 17,562 || 28–23–6 || 62 || 
|-  style="text-align:center; background:#cfc;"
| 58 || February 6 || Colorado || 1–3 || Philadelphia || || Mason || 19,982 || 29–23–6 || 64 || 
|-  style="text-align:center; background:#cfc;"
| 59 || February 8 || Calgary || 1–2 || Philadelphia || || Emery || 19,874 || 30–23–6 || 66 || 
|-  style="text-align:center; background:#fcc;"
| 60 || February 27 || San Jose || 7–3 || Philadelphia || || Mason || 19,879 || 30–24–6 || 66 || 
|-

|-  style="text-align:center;background:#cfc;"
| 61 || March 1 || NY Rangers || 2–4 || Philadelphia || || Mason ||19,988 ||31–24–6 || 68 || 
|-  style="text-align:center;background:#cfc;"
| 62 || March 2 || Philadelphia || 5–4|| Washington || OT || Mason ||18,506||32–24–6 ||70 || 
|-  style="text-align:center;background:#cfc;"
| 63 || March 5 || Washington || 4–6 || Philadelphia || || Mason|| 19,919 ||33–24–6 ||72 || 
|-  style="text-align:center; background:#ffc;"
| 64 || March 8 || Philadelphia || 3–4|| Toronto || OT || Mason ||19,583 ||33–24–7 ||73 || 
|-  style="text-align:center; background:#fcc;"
| 65 || March 11 || New Jersey || 2–1 || Philadelphia || || Mason ||19,967||33–25–7 ||73 || 
|-  style="text-align:center;background:#cfc;"
| 66 || March 15 || Pittsburgh || 0–4 || Philadelphia || || Mason ||19,993 ||34–25–7  || 75 || 
|-  style="text-align:center;background:#cfc;"
| 67 || March 16 || Philadelphia || 4–3 || Pittsburgh || || Mason ||18,647 ||35–25–7 ||77 || 
|-  style="text-align:center;background:#cfc;"
| 68 || March 18 || Chicago ||2–3|| Philadelphia || OT || Emery ||19,932 || 36–25–7 ||79 || 
|-  style="text-align:center; background:#cfc;"
| 69 || March 20 || Dallas || 2–4|| Philadelphia || || Mason|| 19,831|| 37–25–7 ||81 || 
|-  style="text-align:center; background:#cfc;"
| 70 || March 22 || St. Louis ||1–4 || Philadelphia || || Mason ||19,942 || 38–25–7 ||83 || 
|-  style="text-align:center; background:#fcc;"
| 71 || March 24 || Los Angeles || 3–2 || Philadelphia || || Emery || 19,876 || 38–26–7 || 83 || 
|-  style="text-align:center; background:#fcc;"
| 72 || March 26 || Philadelphia || 1–3 || NY Rangers || || Mason || 18,006 || 38–26–7 || 83 || 
|-  style="text-align:center; background:#cfc;"
| 73 || March 28 || Toronto || 2–4 || Philadelphia || || Mason || 19,963 || 39–27–7 || 85 || 
|-  style="text-align:center; background:#ffc;"
| 74 || March 30 || Boston || 4–3 || Philadelphia || SO || Mason || 19,958 || 39–27–8 || 86 || 
|-

|- style="text-align:center; background:#ffc;"
| 75 || April 1 || Philadelphia || 0–1 || St. Louis || SO || Emery || 18,647 || 39–27–9 || 87 || 
|- style="text-align:center; background:#fcc;"
| 76 || April 3 || Columbus || 2–0 || Philadelphia || || Mason || 19,981 || 39–28–9 || 87 || 
|- style="text-align:center; background:#fcc;"
| 77 || April 5 || Philadelphia || 2–5 || Boston || || Emery || 17,565 || 39–29–9 || 87 || 
|- style="text-align:center; background:#cfc;"
| 78 || April 6 || Buffalo || 2–5 || Philadelphia || || Mason || 19,603 || 40–29–9 || 89 || 
|- style="text-align:center; background:#cfc;"
| 79 || April 8 || Philadelphia || 5–2 || Florida || || Mason || 12,487 || 41–29–9 || 91 || 
|- style="text-align:center; background:#fcc;"
| 80 || April 10 || Philadelphia || 2–4 || Tampa Bay || || Emery || 19,204 || 41–30–9 || 91 || 
|- style="text-align:center; background:#cfc;"
| 81 || April 12 || Philadelphia || 4–3 || Pittsburgh || OT || Emery || 18,673 || 42–30–9 || 93 || 
|- style="text-align:center; background:#ffc;"
| 82 || April 13 || Carolina || 6–5 || Philadelphia || SO || Heeter || 19,727 || 42–30–10 || 94 || 
|-

|-
| Legend:

Playoffs

|- style="text-align:center; background:#fcc;"
| 1 || April 17 || Philadelphia || 1–4 || NY Rangers || || Emery || 18,006 || 0–1 || 
|- style="text-align:center; background: #cfc;"
| 2 || April 20 || Philadelphia || 4–2 || NY Rangers || || Emery || 18,006 || 1–1 || 
|- style="text-align:center; background:#fcc;"
| 3 || April 22 || NY Rangers || 4–1 || Philadelphia || || Emery || 20,096 || 1–2 || 
|- style="text-align:center; background: #cfc;"
| 4 || April 25 || NY Rangers || 1–2 || Philadelphia || || Mason || 20,132 || 2–2 || 
|- style="text-align:center; background:#fcc;"
| 5 || April 27 || Philadelphia || 2–4 || NY Rangers || || Mason || 18,006 || 2–3 || 
|- style="text-align:center; background: #cfc;"
| 6 || April 29 || NY Rangers || 2–5 || Philadelphia || || Mason || 20,137 || 3–3 || 
|- style="text-align:center; background:#fcc;"
| 7 || April 30 || Philadelphia || 1–2 || NY Rangers || || Mason || 18,006 || 3–4 || 
|-

|-
| Legend:

Player statistics

Scoring
 Position abbreviations: C = Center; D = Defense; G = Goaltender; LW = Left Wing; RW = Right Wing
  = Joined team via a transaction (e.g., trade, waivers, signing) during the season. Stats reflect time with the Flyers only.
  = Left team via a transaction (e.g., trade, waivers, release) during the season. Stats reflect time with the Flyers only.

Goaltending

Awards and records

Awards

Records

Among the team records set during the 2013–14 season was Claude Giroux scoring four points during the third period on December 19, tying the team record.

Milestones

Suspensions and fines

Transactions
The Flyers were involved in the following transactions from June 25, 2013, the day after the deciding game of the 2013 Stanley Cup Finals, through June 13, 2014, the day of the deciding game of the 2014 Stanley Cup Finals.

Trades

Players acquired

Players lost

Signings

Draft picks

Philadelphia Flyers' picks at the 2013 NHL Entry Draft, which was held at the Prudential Center in Newark, New Jersey on June 30, 2013. The Flyers traded their fourth-round pick to the Tampa Bay Lightning along with Jon Kalinski and a 2012 second-round pick for Pavel Kubina on February 18, 2012.

Farm teams
American Hockey League – Adirondack Phantoms
ECHL – Greenville Road Warriors (affiliation dissolved one month into season)

Notes

References
General
 
 
 
Specific

External links

 Philadelphia Flyers Historical Salaries from CapGeek.com

Philadelphia Flyers seasons
Philadelphia Flyers season, 2013-14
Phil
Philadelphia
Philadelphia